AVN-397 is a 5-hydroxytryptamine subtype 6 receptor antagonist drug developed by Avineuro Pharmaceuticals Inc. that can potentially be used to treat Alzheimer's disease and general anxiety disorder (GAD). Avineuro announced that it would start Phase II clinical trials in 2009, and those trials are ongoing as of 2012.

References 

Antidementia agents
Anxiolytics